Reiner Frieske (born October 11, 1940) is an East German former handball player who competed in the 1972 Summer Olympics.

He was born in Lommatzsch, in Saxony.

In 1972 he was part of the East German team which finished fourth in the Olympic tournament. He played all six matches as goalkeeper.

External links
profile

1940 births
Living people
People from Lommatzsch
German male handball players
Olympic handball players of East Germany
Handball players at the 1972 Summer Olympics
Sportspeople from Saxony